Javed Ali is an Indian playback singer who predominantly sings in Hindi. He has also sung in various Indian languages including Bengali, Kannada, Malayalam, Gujarati, Marathi, Odia, Tamil, Telugu and Urdu.

Early life
Javed Ali was born Javed Hussain in Panchkuian Road, Delhi. He studied in Ramjas School 4, Paharganj. Javed Ali started singing at a very early age with his father Ustad Hamid Hussain, a popular qawwali singer. Ghazal singer Ghulam Ali heard Ali's voice and felt that he could become a great singer in future. Ghulam Ali not only guided Javed, but also gave him chance to sing in his live concerts. As a tribute and honour to his guru Ghulam Ali, Javed changed his name from Javed Hussain to Javed Ali.

Career
In 2007, Javed Ali came into limelight for his song "Ek Din Teri Raahon Mein" from the film Naqaab and thereafter he sang "Jashn-e-Bahaaran" from Jodhaa Akbar, "Arziyan" from Delhi-6, "Kun Faya Kun" from Rockstar, "Guzarish" from Ghajini, "Aa Jao Meri Tamanna" from Ajab Prem Ki Ghazab Kahani, "Gale Lag Ja" from De Dana Dan, "Tu Hi Haqeeqat" from Tum Mile, "Tum Tak" from Raanjhanaa, Jab Tak Hai Jaan title track from the film Jab Tak Hai Jaan, "Deewana Kar Raha Hai" from Raaz 3, "Ishaqzaade" title track from the film Ishaqzaade, "Galat Baat Hai" from Main Tera Hero, Daawat-e-Ishq film's title track, "Maula" from Wazir, "Nagada Nagada" from Jab We Met, "Tu Jo Mila" from Bajrangi Bhaijaan, "Saanson Ke" from Raees, "Kuch Nahi" from Tubelight, and "Naina Lade" from Dabangg 3. He is doing playback singing in various regional languages like Bengali, Kannada, Malayalam, Marathi, Odia, Tamil, Telugu and Urdu. He judged reality shows like Sa Re Ga Ma Pa L'il Champs 2011 on Zee TV Great Music Gurukul 2015 on Colors Bangla, Sa Re Ga Ma Pa L'il Champs 2017 on Zee TV and Indian Idol Season 10 in 2018 on Sony Entertainment Television. Javed Ali also hosted Zee TV's singing reality show Sa Re Ga Ma Pa 2012. He is currently hosting Super star singer 2022.

Discography

Hindi film songs

Bengali film songs

Bhojpuri Film Songs

Malayalam film songs

Kannada film songs

Odia film songs

Tamil Songs

Gujarati Songs

Telugu songs

Marathi Songs

Punjabi Songs

Urdu film songs

Nepali film songs

Marathi Album songs

Albums 

He has also sung many devotional songs with popular singers like Debashish, Preeti, Pinky, Charanjeet Singh Sondhi, Soham Chakraborty, Kalpana, Priya Bhattacharya etc.In 2018 he sang for Manju Warrier starrer Malayalam film Aami.The song 'Chand Hoga' was written by Gulzar and music by Taufiq Qureshi.The film is a biopic on Indian English writer Kamala Das.

Recently Javed Ali working on his Music Video Single 'Rangreziya' . He sang as well as composed the song for his Video Single.

Singles and music videos

Television career
 Mentored the singing reality show Sa Re Ga Ma Pa L'il Champs 2011 on Zee TV.
 Hosted Zee TV's Singing Reality Show Sa Re Ga Ma Pa 2012.
 Mentored Bengali Singing Reality Show on Colors Bangla named Great Music Gurukul in 2015.
 One of the Judges of Zee TV's Singing Reality Show Sa Re Ga Ma Pa L'il Champs 2017
 One of the Judges of Indian Idol Season 10 (Replacement of Anu Malik)
 One of the judge of Superstar Singer
 One of the judge of Sa Re Ga Ma Pa L'il Champs 2020 (Replacement of Udit Narayan and Kumar Sanu with Himesh Reshammiya

Awards and nominations

Awards won
 IIFA Awards 2009 in The Best Male Playback Singer category for the song Jashn-E-Bahara from the film Jodhaa Akbar.
 Screen Awards 2012 (19th) in The Best Playback Singer Category for the Title Track of the film named Ishaqzaade.
 Own Radio Mirchi's Mirchi Music Awards (4 Awards) in 2012 in the following categories: Best Song Representing the Sufi Tradition – Kun Faya Kun from the film Rockstar, Best Indipop Song "Mera Kya Saheb Haitera" from "Dil Ki Baatein", Best Album of the year and Mirchi listener Award for Rockstar.
 Uttar Pradesh Government has Honored Javed Ali with the highest prestigious award of the state – Yash Bharti Samman.
 India TV awarded Javed Ali with the Yuwa Award 2015.

Nominated for awards
 Nominated For Filmfare Awards (2010) for The Best Male Playback Singer category for the song Arziyan from the film Delhi-6.
 Nominated For 63rd Filmfare Awards South (2016) for The Best Male Playback Singer category for the song Sanje Veleli from the film Luv U Alia.
 Nominated for Zee Cine Awards (2013) for The Best Male Playback Singer category for the song Ishaqzaade from the film Ishaqzaade.
 Nominated For South India International Movie Awards (2022) for Best Male Playback Singer (Telugu) category for the song Nee Kannu Neeli Samudram from the film Uppena.

Live performances
Javed Ali performs live with his band all over the world. In 2016 July–August Javed Ali performed in 9 cities of the United States of America. Also Javed Ali regular performs in maestro A.R Rahman's worldwide live concert tours.
On 15 August 2016 Javed Ali performed in the Headquarters of the United Nations with the maestro A.R Rahman to celebrate India's 70th Independence Day.

Social works
Along with playback singing & live performing, Javed Ali is associated with various social works. He performs live for various social causes to raise funds. 

In 2016 Javed Ali performed in Mumbai at a fundraiser event for war widows.

He recently performed for a fund raiser for an old age home at Satpala, Virar in Palghar, Maharashtra on 10 November 2018.

References

External links

 Javed Ali Official Website
 
 "Tum Mile" Music Review on IMDB
 

Living people
Indian male pop singers
Bollywood playback singers
Bengali playback singers
Kannada playback singers
Malayalam playback singers
Marathi playback singers
Odia playback singers
Tamil playback singers
Telugu playback singers
Urdu playback singers
Indian qawwali singers
Screen Awards winners
International Indian Film Academy Awards winners
1982 births